Anna Górnicka-Antonowicz (born June 24, 1968) is a Polish orienteering competitor. She received a bronze medal in the short distance at the 2000 European Orienteering Championships in Truskavets, behind Jenny Johansson and Simone Luder. Her best result in the World Championships was 8th in the middle distance in 2003.

References

External links
 
 
 

1968 births
Living people
Place of birth missing (living people)
Polish orienteers
Female orienteers
Foot orienteers
Competitors at the 2001 World Games
21st-century Polish women